First Light, also known as The First Light, is a 2015 drama film written and directed by Vincenzo Marra and starring Riccardo Scamarcio. It was screened in the Venice Days section at the 72nd Venice International Film Festival, in which it won the Pasinetti Award for Venice Days' Best film.

Plot 
Marco is a young and cynical lawyer from Bari. He lives with his partner Martina and their 7-year-old son Mateo. The love story between Marco and Martina, who is Chilean, is about to end. Martina wants to go back to Chile with little Mateo, but Marco doesn't agree as he doesn't want to be separated from his son. However, Martina decides to run away with Mateo, going to Chile and losing her tracks. Marco has no news of his son, and after a period of anguish and confusion he decides to go look for him. He finds himself in a South American metropolis of 6 million people, a reality that makes his research difficult. After an agonizing and inconclusive search, Martina and Mateo seem to have vanished into thin air.

Cast  

 Riccardo Scamarcio as Marco
 Daniela Ramirez as Martina
 Gianfabio Pezzolla as Mateo
 Luis Gnecco as Ramos, the Lawyer 
 Alejandro Goic as  Carlos, the Detective 
 Paulina Urrutia as the Judge
 Maria Eugenia Barrenechea as Martina's Aunt

See also 
 List of Italian films of 2015

References

External links 
 

 
2015 drama films
2015 films
Italian drama films
Films directed by Vincenzo Marra
2010s Italian films